Megan Hunt may refer to:
 Megan Hunt (footballer) (born 1995), Australian footballer
 Megan Hunt (politician) (born 1986), Nebraska state senator
 Megan Hunt (Body of Proof), a fictional character in the TV series Body of Proof